William Trevor Thomas (8 March 1907 – 3 February 1969), also known by the nickname of "Ocker", was a Welsh dual-code international rugby union, and professional rugby league footballer who played in the 1930s and 1940s.

Background
William "Ocker" Thomas was born in Merthyr Tydfil, Wales, and he died aged 61 in Sofrydd, Crumlin , Wales (death registered in Pontypool, Wales).

Playing career

International honours
Thomas won a cap for Wales (RU) while at Abertillery RFC in 1930 against England, and won 3 caps for Wales (RL) in 1932–1940 while at Oldham, and Wigan.

County Cup Final appearances
During Thomas' time at Oldham, they had a 12-0 victory over St Helens Recs in the 1933 Lancashire County Cup Final during the 1933–34 season at Station Road, Swinton on Saturday 18 November 1933. Thomas played right-, i.e. number 12, in Wigan's 10-7 victory over Salford in the 1938 Lancashire County Cup Final during the 1938–39 season at Station Road, Swinton on Saturday 22 October 1938.

References

External links
 (archived by web.archive.org) Statistics at orl-heritagetrust.org.uk
Statistics at wigan.rlfans.com

1907 births
1969 deaths
Abertillery RFC players
Dual-code rugby internationals
Oldham R.L.F.C. players
Rugby league players from Merthyr Tydfil
Rugby league second-rows
Rugby union players from Merthyr Tydfil
Wales international rugby union players
Wales national rugby league team players
Welsh rugby league players
Welsh rugby union players
Wigan Warriors players